Caroline Holmyard (born 17 December 1961) is a former synchronized swimmer from Great Britain.

References 

1961 births
Living people
British synchronised swimmers
Olympic synchronised swimmers of Great Britain
Synchronized swimmers at the 1984 Summer Olympics